Henry Wilding (20 August 1844, Stepney, London –1916) was a notable New Zealand banker, timber miller, farmer, broker and social reformer. He was born in London, England in 1844.

References

1844 births
1916 deaths
New Zealand bankers
English emigrants to New Zealand
New Zealand sawmillers
New Zealand activists
People from Stepney